Mikkel Rufus Mutahi Bischoff (born 3 February 1982) is a Danish football pundit and former professional player  who played as a centre back. Having started his senior career with AB in 2001, he joined Manchester City a year later. For Manchester City, he only made two appearances in four years and was loaned out to Wolverhampton Wanderers and Sheffield Wednesday. After leaving Manchester City, he spent half a season at Coventry City before returning to Denmark with Brøndby where he remained for a few years. He ended his career with Lyngby in 2011. He also played four games for the Denmark under-21 national team.

Career 
Born in Copenhagen, Bischoff made his senior debut with Danish club Akademisk Boldklub, where he made just eleven Danish league appearances. On 15 May 2002, he moved abroad to join English club Manchester City for a fee of £750,000. He was the fourth Dane to sign for Manchester City in less than a year, with Peter Schmeichel, Niclas Jensen and Kevin Stuhr Ellegaard at City already. Signing Bischoff was part of a move to strengthen the team's prospects for the future, and he made his debut for the Danish under-21 national team upon his arrival at City. After making his one and only league appearance for City against Blackburn Rovers in September 2002, he underwent a hernia operation, and was unable to make an impression for the club. He was under the knife again in the summer of 2003 after picking up a foot injury playing for the Denmark under-21 side.

Things did not get much better for Bischoff during the 2003–04 season. He returned for just one game – making an appearance in the starting lineup for the second-leg UEFA Cup win over League of Wales club The New Saints in August. Bischoff returned to the reserves.

At the end of September 2004, Bischoff joined Championship side Wolverhampton Wanderers on a month-long loan deal, in order to gain some valuable first team experience. After impressing in seven appearances and a goal against Nottingham Forest, he remained at Molineux as he signed a season-long loan deal with the club on the last day of the transfer window.

Bischoff returned to Manchester City at the end of the season, but after another half-year as a substitute, he signed a loan deal with Sheffield Wednesday in March 2006 and made his "Owls" debut against QPR the following day. In spite of suffering a small injury, Bischoff played his part in helping Wednesday avoid relegation from the Football League Championship. At the end of the season, he was released by Manchester City, along with nine teammates, following the expiration of his contract. He went on to sign for Coventry City several weeks later, in June 2006. After three games in seven months, Bischoff moved back to Denmark on a free transfer in the January 2007 transfer window, in order to play for Brøndby IF. He played regularly during his first couple of seasons at the club, before retiring at age 30 on 10 August 2012.

Career statistics

References

External links

Danish national team profile

1982 births
Living people
Danish people of Kenyan descent
Association football central defenders
Danish men's footballers
Denmark under-21 international footballers
Manchester City F.C. players
Sheffield Wednesday F.C. players
Wolverhampton Wanderers F.C. players
Coventry City F.C. players
Brøndby IF players
Danish Superliga players
Premier League players
English Football League players
Danish expatriate men's footballers
Expatriate footballers in England
Danish expatriate sportspeople in England
Footballers from Copenhagen